Julie Ashley Zetlin (born June 30, 1990) is a retired elite rhythmic gymnast. She is the 2010 U.S. Senior National Champion in Rhythmic Gymnastics, and represented the United States at the 2012 Olympic Games.

Personal life 
Zetlin is Jewish, and her mother Zsuzsi is a former Hungarian national champion in the sport.

Career 
Zetlin began rhythmic gymnastics instruction at the age of four. She has been a member of the U.S. junior and senior national rhythmic gymnastics teams since 2004. She trained with longtime coach Olga Kutuzova at Capital Rhythmics in Darnestown, Maryland.

Junior career
In her final year as a junior competitor, Zetlin placed second all-around at 2005 Junior U.S. National Championships in Indianapolis, Indiana, and she won the junior titles on rope, hoop, clubs and ribbon. In 2002, she competed in her first Junior Nationals in Cleveland, Ohio, where she placed 12th all-around. At 2004 Junior Nationals in Nashville, Tennessee, she placed second in the all-around, rope, clubs and ribbon, as well as third in ball.

Senior career
In 2006, her first year in senior competition, she finished fourth all-around at 2006 Nationals in St. Paul, Minnesota, and she placed first in rope and clubs. She also placed fifth all-around and fourth in rope at the 2006 Pacific Alliance Championships in Honolulu, Hawaii, where the U.S. captured the team gold medal. She notched a third-place finish in the all-around at 2007 Nationals in San Jose, California, where she won ribbon, placed second in hoop and placed third in ribbon and clubs.

Zetlin placed fourth all-around at 2008 Nationals in Houston, Texas, where she earned third-place finishes in rope, clubs, and ribbon. At 2009 Nationals in Dallas, Texas, Zetlin placed third in the all-around, rope, ribbon and ball, and she earned a fourth-place finish in hoop.

Zetlin placed 23rd all-around (99.025) at the 2010 World Rhythmic Gymnastics Championships in Moscow, Russia, where she became the first U.S gymnast to advance to the world all-around finals since Mary Sanders in 2003. At the 2010 Pan American Games in Guadalajara, Mexico, Zetlin won the all-around, rope and ball, and she placed third in ribbon. The U.S. also earned the team silver medal in rhythmic gymnastics.

She captured the all-around title at the 2010 U.S. National Rhythmic Gymnastics Championships, along with first-place finishes in hoop, ball and ribbon. She earned a second-place finish in rope.

In September 2011, Zetlin was named to the U.S. team for the 2011 Rhythmic World Championships, which took place during September in Montpellier, France. She was the top finisher from the continent, and therefore she was in top contention for the wildcard for the 2012 Olympic Games. At the 2011 Pan-American Games in Guadalajara, Mexico during October, Zetlin captured gold medals in the all-around, ball and ribbon.

She was awarded a wildcard for the 2012 Olympic Games as the highest ranked gymnast from the Americas. At the Olympic Games, she placed 21st in the qualifications and did not advance into the finals.

Legacy 
On December 15, 2015, it was announced that Zetlin had been inducted as a 2016 class of the USA Gymnastics Hall of Fame.

See also
List of Jewish gymnasts

References

1990 births
Living people
People from Bethesda, Maryland
American rhythmic gymnasts
Gymnasts at the 2007 Pan American Games
Gymnasts at the 2011 Pan American Games
Jewish gymnasts
Jewish American sportspeople
Gymnasts at the 2012 Summer Olympics
Olympic gymnasts of the United States
Pan American Games gold medalists for the United States
Pan American Games silver medalists for the United States
Sportspeople from Maryland
Pan American Games medalists in gymnastics
Medalists at the 2011 Pan American Games
21st-century American Jews
21st-century American women